Vivian Corazone Aquino Odhiambo (born 2 October 1998), known as Vivian Corazone, is a Kenyan footballer who plays as a midfielder for Simba Queens and the Kenya women's national team. She is known for her ability to use both feet and trickery on the ball.

Club career

Early career
Masa Babes
Corazone started playing football at Nairobi’s Makongeni based side Masa Babes in 2007 at the age of 9.

Makongeni High school
Makongeni High school in Nairobi enrolled Corazone for her secondary education in 2012, she played for the school’s football team until she left in 2013.

Olympic High school
In 2013, Corazone joined Olympic High school in 2013, she played for the school’s football team and was part of the team that won the 2013  National Crown and participated in the East Africa Secondary school games.

Senior career
Soccer Queens
Soccer Queens acquired Corazone's services immediately after she finished high school, she has two goals and six assists in the 2016 Kenya Women Premier League, and is also captain of Soccer Queens.
Corazone, is currently playing for Simba Queens which is a sister team of Simba Sports club of Tanzania.

International career
In 2014, Corazone was the captain of the Kenya women's national under-17 team, which was coached by Kadualo. She now represents Kenya at senior level and has 4 goals to her name.

Achievements
Olympic High School
Kenya Secondary School Games Champions 2013

Personal life
Corazone was named after the former President of the Philippines, Corazon Aquino.

See also
List of Kenya women's international footballers

References

1998 births
Living people
Footballers from Nairobi
Kenyan women's footballers
Women's association football midfielders
Atlético Ouriense players
Kenya women's international footballers
Kenyan expatriate footballers
Kenyan expatriate sportspeople in Portugal
Expatriate women's footballers in Portugal